Svitlovodsk is a city located on the banks of the Dnieper River in Oleksandriya Raion, Kirovohrad Oblast in central Ukraine. It is the administrative center of Svitlovodsk urban hromada, one of the many hromadas of Ukraine.

Between 1962 and 1969, the city was briefly renamed Kremhes, reflecting its status as a satellite city of  Kremenchuk.

Administrative status 
Until 18 July, 2020, Svitlovodsk was designated as a city of oblast significance and belonged to the Svitlovodsk Municipality. It was the administrative center of Svitlovodsk Raion, even though it did not belong to the raion. As part of the administrative reform of Ukraine (which reduced the number of raions of Kirovohrad Oblast to four), Svitlovodsk Municipality was merged into Oleksandriia Raion.

History
The city was developed and spread outward from the Kremenchuk Hydroelectric Power Plant. The original point of the city was to house the dam workers. 

The definite start of the city was the 1950s — before that, Svetlovodsk (Bright Waterway) did not exist, the name was invented by Khrushchev's regime, to replace the town of Novogeorgievsk that was in the flood plain of the new hydro-electric station.

When the dam was completed, the then Soviet leader Khrushchev attended the opening ceremonies, the city started to expand westward, along the coast. In local culture, the city is known as Old City and New City, although, it is still the same Svetlovodsk. The power was needed for smelting of defense industry grade metals and alloys, The facility was "secret" for several years, but it is still operating today as a private enterprise.

Climate

Twin towns – sister cities
 Schorndorf, Germany (2023)

Environment
The area around Svetlovodsk is relatively clean. The city itself has several plants and trees - most notably, the rows of trees that go linear to Lenin Street. The area around the city is relatively clean, consisting of small villages and forests. The one noted polluting facility is the smelter. It has been operating for decades, without any pollution controls during the Soviet era, and with little control by the current Ukrainian government. Generations of people were exposed to heavy metals pollution, though no definite studies have been carried out on the same. 
The reservoir has been polluted for years. In the summertime, green algae takes over parts of it, producing fish-kills and introducing odors to the area.

Transportation
Transportation through the city is primarily through private-run bus lines with mini-buses, although the main buses still run. There is a working bus station near the east side of town. There is also a bus depot near the dam, as well as a train that runs along the dam and goes to the village.

Highlights of the city
The town hall is in the "Old Svitlovodsk" area and the eternal fire memorial is just below near the airplane memorial. 
The city is a birthplace of the Soviet cosmonaut Yuri Malenchenko and Ukrainian politician Mykola Martynenko.
The market is located in the "New Svitlovodsk", featuring goods for buying and selling. There are two monuments near the market. Below them are a series of water fountains that go downward. The aforementioned bus depot and train stations are also highlights.

See also 

 List of cities in Ukraine

References

Cities in Kirovohrad Oblast
Populated places established in the Ukrainian Soviet Socialist Republic
Cities of regional significance in Ukraine
City name changes in Ukraine
Populated places on the Dnieper in Ukraine
Company towns in Ukraine